Detective Naani is an Indian Hindi-language mystery comedy film released on 22 May 2009. It is directed by debutante Romilla Mukherjee and stars Ava Mukherjee with Zain Khan, Amit Verma and Shweta Gulati.

Plot
It's a regular day at Gulmohar Complex. Spunky, independent, 72-year-old Naani is on her way back home from her daily morning walk. Suddenly her eye catches the face of a little girl peeping nervously from a 3rd floor window. The flat belongs to a newly arrived childless couple called Yadavs.

The girl hides away quickly. Naani's intrigue about the little girl leads her to a possible murder. Naani finds herself in the middle of a mystery where some people will come to her aid, some will be indifferent and some will prove to be dangerous. When the CID dismisses Naani's story due to lack of hard evidence, she transforms into a detective.

She uses her home-spun common-sense and logic and she carries out her investigation in classic "whodunit" style. Of course, Naani's rather eccentric methods of investigation lead to many quirky and humorous incidents. Her unusual team of deputies consists of her two inquisitive little grandchildren Anjali and Nakul, her divorced daughter Priya Sinha and a couple of teenagers Rohan and Neeti.

The search for one lost little girl leads Naani & Co. to a racket where the stakes are high, the criminals are ruthless, and their leader is powerful. Once Naani gets too close to their trail, she endangers herself. She finds herself sharing the same plight as the little girl she had seen in the window. Naani's team of amateur detectives get together and finally win the day with a little help from the CID.At the heart of this story is the terrified, kidnapped little girl. Her plight acts as a reminder to the audience that Naani's mission  was  a race against time. And yet, this adventure has a positive effect on all the characters that get involved. Bridges are built, relationships blossom, lessons are learnt.

The two squabbling teenagers fall in love, there is a whiff of a romance between Naani's divorced daughter and the dashing CID Inspector. Old Mr. Pal finds a renewed energy and interest in life. And of course, a lost 4-year-old little girl Neelima Daamle is finally re-united with her mother. The Yadavs are sent to jail for the crime of human trafficking.

Cast
 Ava Mukherjee as Naani
 Simran Singh as Anjali Sinha
 Amit Verma as Rohan Malhotra
 Shweta Gulati as Neeti Tipnis
 Ankur Nayyar as CID Inspector Bhatia
 Zain Khan as Nakun Somesh Dutt
 Saili Shettye as Little Kidnapped Girl Neelima Daamle
 Hemu Adhikari as Mahesh Pal
 Atul Parchure as Petook
 Hemant Pandey as Tattu
 Sanjeeva Vatsa as Raj Yadav
 Shubhangi Gokhale as Madhu Pal
 Jaywant Wadkar as Goonda Pakya
 Sanjay Singh as Goonda Choti
 Amrita Raichand as Priya Sinha
 Mahru Sheikh as Tara
 Mohit Chauhan

References

External links
 

2009 films
2000s Hindi-language films
Indian detective films